Second Street Historic District may refer to:
 Second Street Historic District, part of the Central Troy Historic District in Troy, New York
 Second Street Historic District (Albemarle, North Carolina), a National Register of Historic Places listing in Stanly County, North Carolina
 Second Street Historic District (Portsmouth, Ohio), a National Register of Historic Places listing in Scioto County, Ohio

See also
West Second Street Historic District (disambiguation)
East Second Street Commercial Historic District (disambiguation)
Greater Second Street Historic District, Ottumwa, Iowa, U.S.